Jašiūnai is a town in Lithuania. It is situated on the Merkys River and an edge of the Rūdninkai Forest. According to the 2001 census, it had population of 1,879. The town's population is primarily Poles (some 74,5%), with Lithuanians (12,4%) and Russians (8,4%).

History

The town was first mentioned in written sources in 1402. From the 15th to 18th century, the town belonged to the Radziwiłł family. In 1811 it was bought by Ignacy Baliński, father of historian Michał Baliński. His wife from the Śniadecki family initiated construction of the neoclassical Jašiūnai Manor, designed by architect Karol Podczaszyński. The construction was undertaken between 1824 and 1828. The manor became a cultural center: it was a residence of Jan Śniadecki and Juliusz Słowacki frequently visited by Adam Mickiewicz, Tomasz Zan, Stanisław Bonifacy Jundziłł, Józef Mianowski. This generation of Polish Romantics studied and idealized the history and culture of the former Grand Duchy of Lithuania. These studies had great influence on the worldview of the szlachta of the Vilnius Region: they would identify themselves as Poles while remaining loyal to the Grand Duchy.

Alongside cultural life, the manor owners encouraged small industry: a ceramics workshop (still operating as of 2009), a factory of resin and turpentine, brickyard, paper factory. After the Uprising of 1863 and Baliński's death, Jašiūnai lost its position as a cultural center. The valuable library collection was transported to Poland or lost during the wars. As part of the Wilno Voivodeship, Jašiūnai belonged to the Second Polish Republic during the interwar period.

During World War II, Jews were assembled in a building in the Jašiūnai manor and locked there. In September 25, 1941, the Jews of Jašiūnai were shot, together with those from other villages by the Vilnius Special Squad. According to the Jäger Report, 575 Jews were murdered that day: 215 men, 229 women and 131 children. Three Roma people were shot and buried together with the Jews.

Religion
The first church, named after St. Anna, was built in 1515. When the Radziwiłłs converted to Protestantism, the church was also transformed from a Catholic to a Protestant church. The church was destroyed during the Great Northern War with Sweden (1700–1721). For a long time the town had only a chapel. The current church was built in 1929. It is half-brick, half-wooden church with a single rectangular tower. Its central nave is separated from the aisles by wooden pillars. The wooden ceiling attempts to imitate vaults. The main altar is decorated with a copy of Our Lady of the Gate of Dawn.

There was a synagogue in Jašiūnai containing 800 books in the Jewish language.

Symbols
In 2001 the town received its coats of arms, designed by Arvydas Každailis. The coat of arms depict a silver column in a red shield with two golden stars on each side. The column represents classical architecture and the manor. It also carries symbolical meaning of strength and power. The two stars are dedicated to the two families prominent in town's history – Balińskis and Śniadeckis.

References

Towns in Lithuania
Towns in Vilnius County
Vilnius Voivodeship
Vilensky Uyezd
Wilno Voivodeship (1926–1939)
Holocaust locations in Lithuania